The Kalaidos University of Applied Sciences Switzerland (Kalaidos UAS) is a University of Applied Sciences in Switzerland with the departments of Business and Management, Law, Health, Music and Applied Psychology. It was founded in 1997 and today is one of nine accredited Swiss Universities of Applied Sciences, being the only privately owned one. It has 4’400 students, 725 lecturers (as of December 31, 2021) and around 12’000 graduates. Kalaidos UAS is a foundation, which is a federally accredited University of Applied Sciences under Swiss law.

History
Kalaidos UAS was founded in 1997 under the names "PHW Private Hochschule Wirtschaft” and “AKAD Hochschule für Berufstätige” as a monodisciplinary University of Applied Sciences with business degree programs. On April 6, 2005, the Swiss Federal Council granted the Kalaidos University of Applied Sciences Foundation approval to establish and operate the Kalaidos University of Applied Sciences. This approval is based on the Federal Law of October 6, 1995 on Universities of Applied Sciences and the Ordinance on Universities of Applied Sciences (FHSV) of September 11, 1996 and, in particular, on the results of a multi-year peer review process in which compliance with university standards at Kalaidos UAS was reviewed and confirmed. In 2013, the Federal Council decreed the federal accreditation of the University of Applied Sciences on the basis of the Higher Education Act (HEdA), which was passed in 2011 and came into force on January 1, 2015. The renewal of accreditation is due in 2021/2022.  With this, the Federal Council confirms the recognition of Kalaidos UAS as a private University of Applied Sciences with several departments.

Kalaidos UAS is audited and supervised by the Swiss Accreditation Council on behalf of the federal government and, as a private university, receives no financial subsidies from the state. It is operated by the Kalaidos Education Group, which has been part of the Klett Group since 2019.

Kalaidos UAS is a member of Swissuniversities, the Rectors' Conference of Swiss Universities.

The word "Kalaidos" derives from the Greek language and means "beautiful image."

Departments
Kalaidos UAS has five departments with part-time degree programs. Full-time study programs are not offered. The Department of Business and Management offers various degree programs in the field of business administration. The Department of Health was established in 2006 and has undergone several restructurings since then. Today, various degree programs for nursing professions are offered. The Department of Music offers bachelor's and master's degree programs in music education. The Department of Law, Kalaidos Law School, offers a Bachelor of Law as well as various advanced training courses. With the foundation of the Department of Applied Psychology at the beginning of 2022, Kalaidos University of Applied Sciences established a fifth department. This new department offers training and continuing education as well as research and services in Applied Psychology.

Research 
The mandatory performance mandate for Kalaidos University of Applied Sciences includes applied research and development. Consequently, the five departments have respective responsible research departments. The researchers are responsible for practical research and development and teach the research methods to the students.

Alumni 

 Laetitia Noemi Hahn, Pianist, taught by Grigory Gruzman
 Nuron Mukumi, Pianist
 Sergey Belyavskyi, Pianist

See also
Website of Kalaidos University of Applied Science (German)
List of Swiss universities by enrollment 
Website der Alumni Kalaidos Fachhochschule (German)
https://www.studyinswitzerland.plus/university/kalaidos-uas/

References

External links 
 
 Website of the Kalaidos Swiss Education Group, the UAS parent corporation
 The Swiss government's official list of recognized Universities and Universities of Applied Sciences

Universities of Applied Sciences in Switzerland
Educational institutions established in 1995
1995 establishments in Switzerland